Removable glue (sometimes incorrectly called fugitive glue) also called credit card glue, E-z-release glue, or (colloquially) booger glue, snot glue, or  gooey glue, is a low-tack adhesive that produces a removable, non-permanent joint.

Removable glues are usually available in hot melt or latex form, with low VOC emissions. They can be also applied in liquid form.

References

External links
Packaging Glues

Adhesives
Packaging materials